People's Artist was a Russian music competition television series, based on the popular British reality television series Pop Idol. It was produced by RTR in association with FBI Music and FremantleMedia. Season 1 and 2 were hosted by Fyokla Tolstaya and Ivan Urgant.

People's Artist remains today the only Idol series to feature miming in their "best of" show (Финальный Концерт final'niy kontsert) where none of the contestants sang live.

Season 1
Aleksey Goman won season one, with Aleksandr Panayotov coming in second.

Finalists
(ages stated at time of contest)

Season 2
Kyiv, Ukraine and Minsk, Belarus were included in the auditions this season which resulted in almost all finalists from that season coming from one of the two countries and no auditions outside of Russia being held in the next season.

Finalists
(ages stated at time of contest)

Season 3
This season had auditions in Moscow, Voronezh, Saratov, Kazan, Kaliningrad, Saint Petersburg, Irkutsk and Chelyabinsk. The 125 chosen candidates (35 males and 90 females) advanced to Moscow in the theatre round where they were reduced to 10 finalists to perform live on television. Season three was hosted by Olga Shelest and Oskar Kuchera. On June 3, 2006, Amarkhuu Borkhuu won with 61.7% of the vote over Marina Devyatova.

The jury this season was:
Evgeniy Fridlyand
Maksim Dunayevsky
Gennady Khazanov
Alena Sviridova

References

External links
 The first English website

2000s Russian television series
2003 Russian television series debuts
2006 Russian television series endings
Idols (franchise)
Russia-1 original programming
Russian music television series
Russian reality television series
Russian television series based on British television series
Television series by Fremantle (company)